The Ditchrider House, located north of U.S. Route 212 in or near Nisland, South Dakota, is listed on the National Register of Historic Places.

The house is one of eleven houses used by ditchriders on the Belle Fourche Irrigation Project. It is a cottage built in 1916 in Bungalow architecture / Craftsman architecture by the U.S. Bureau of Reclamation. The house is a one-story building with about  area.

References

Houses on the National Register of Historic Places in South Dakota
Houses completed in 1916
National Register of Historic Places in Butte County, South Dakota
Houses in Butte County, South Dakota